The 2021 Yarra Valley Classic was a tournament on the 2021 WTA Tour, one of six events in the 2021 Melbourne Summer Series. It was played on outdoor hard courts in Melbourne, Australia. It was organised as a lead-up tournament to the 2021 Australian Open, and was held at the same venue, due to other tournaments in Australia being cancelled as a result from the COVID-19 pandemic. This tournament took place simultaneously with the 2021 Gippsland Trophy and the 2021 Grampians Trophy. Players who had originally intended to participate in this tournament or the Gippsland Trophy, but were forced to undergo strict quarantine measures upon arrival in Australia, were able to participate in the 2021 Grampians Trophy. The entry list of 2021 Australian Open was used to determine the entry list of this tournament; with half the players (selected randomly) playing the Yarra Valley Classic, and the other half playing the 2021 Gippsland Trophy.

In the women's singles final, Ashleigh Barty defeated Garbiñe Muguruza in straight sets, while Shuko Aoyama and Ena Shibahara won in women's doubles.

Champions

Singles

  Ashleigh Barty def.  Garbiñe Muguruza 7–6(7–3), 6–4

Doubles

  Shuko Aoyama /  Ena Shibahara def.  Anna Kalinskaya /  Viktória Kužmová, 6–3, 6–4

Singles main-draw entrants

Seeds

1 Rankings are as of 25 January 2021

Other entrants
The following players received wildcards into the main draw:
  Kimberly Birrell
  Lizette Cabrera
  Daria Gavrilova
  Maddison Inglis

The following players received entry using a protected ranking into the Australian Open singles main draw, and hence this tournament as well:
  Mona Barthel
  Yaroslava Shvedova
  Zhu Lin
  Vera Zvonareva

The following players received entry from the Australian Open qualifying draw:
  Clara Burel
  Elisabetta Cocciaretto
  Olga Danilović
  Francesca Jones
  Greet Minnen
  Tsvetana Pironkova
  Liudmila Samsonova
  Mayar Sherif

The following players received entry into this tournament as they were potential lucky losers for the Australian Open singles main draw:
  Ysaline Bonaventure
  Ankita Raina
  Kamilla Rakhimova

The following players received entry as an alternate:
  Caroline Dolehide
  Vera Lapko

Withdrawals
Before the tournament
  Kirsten Flipkens → replaced by  Vera Lapko
  Zhang Shuai → replaced by  Caroline Dolehide
During the tournament
  Serena Williams

Retirements
  Camila Giorgi

Doubles main-draw entrants

Seeds 

 Rankings are as of 25 January 2021

Other entrants
The following pairs received a wildcard into the doubles main draw:
  Lizette Cabrera /  Maddison Inglis
  Jaimee Fourlis /  Charlotte Kempenaers-Pocz
  Olivia Gadecki /  Belinda Woolcock

The following pair received entry as alternates:
  Leylah Annie Fernandez /  Anastasia Potapova
  Danka Kovinić /  Jasmine Paolini
  Aleksandra Krunić /  Martina Trevisan

Withdrawals
Before the tournament
  Tímea Babos /  Kristina Mladenovic → replaced by  Leylah Annie Fernandez /  Anastasia Potapova
  Misaki Doi /  Nao Hibino → replaced by  Aleksandra Krunić /  Martina Trevisan
  Anastasia Pavlyuchenkova /  Anastasija Sevastova → replaced by  Danka Kovinić /  Jasmine Paolini
During the tournament
  Marta Kostyuk /  Aliaksandra Sasnovich

Retirements
  Karolína Muchová /  Markéta Vondroušová

Points and prize money

Point distribution

Prize money

*per team

See also
Other events in the 2021 Melbourne Summer Series:
 2021 Phillip Island Trophy
 2021 Grampians Trophy
 2021 Great Ocean Road Open
 2021 Murray River Open
 2021 Gippsland Trophy

References

External links

2021
2021 WTA Tour
2021 in Australian tennis
Tennis tournaments in Australia
Tennis in Victoria (Australia)
January 2021 sports events in Australia
February 2021 sports events in Australia